Where There's Life is a 1947 American thriller comedy film directed by Sidney Lanfield. The film's title derives from a line in Don Quixote ("Where there's life, there's hope") as a play on the name of its star, Bob Hope. Also in the cast are Signe Hasso, William Bendix, and George Coulouris.

Plot
Hope plays an American radio announcer named Michael Valentine who finds out he is the new king of "Barovia", although a secret society called the Mordia, which believes it has assassinated Valentine's father, King Hubertus II, has other ideas.

Cast

Bob Hope as Michael Joseph Valentine
Signe Hasso as General Katrina Grimovitch
William Bendix as Victor O'Brien
George Coulouris as Prime Minister Krivoc
Vera Marshe as Hazel O'Brien
George Zucco as Paul Stertorius
Dennis Hoey as Minister of War Grubitch
John Alexander as Herbert Jones
Victor Varconi as Finance Minister Zavitch
Joseph Vitale as Albert Miller
Harry von Zell as Joe Snyder
Anthony Caruso as John Fulda
Norma Varden as Mabel Jones
Harland Tucker as Mr. Alvin (Floorwalker)
Roy Atwell as Salesman
Emil Rameau as Dr. Josefsberg
William Edmunds as King Hubertus II
Crane Whitley as Assassin with Cane

Notes

External links

1947 films
1940s comedy thriller films
American black-and-white films
American comedy thriller films
1940s English-language films
Films scored by Victor Young
Films about radio people
Films directed by Sidney Lanfield
Films set in Europe
Films set in New York City
Monarchy in fiction
Paramount Pictures films
1947 comedy films
1940s American films